Calophya schini is a psyllid common on Schinus molle with a wide distribution wherever this tree has been distributed as a garden ornamental.

Distribution
C. schini is endemic to Central America but widespread further distribution including USA and New Zealand.

Description 
The adult, with wings folded, is 2mm long. Generally orange to pale yellow or green coloured, wings hyaline. Nymphs produce marked dimples on the leaves and in large numbers cause severe malformations.

Gallery

References 

Calophyidae